Montfalcon is a commune in the Isère department in southeastern France.

Geography
The village lies on the left bank of the Galaure, which flows west through the southern part of the commune.

Population

See also
Communes of the Isère department

References

Communes of Isère
Isère communes articles needing translation from French Wikipedia